Ejnar Jacobsen  (June 9, 1897 – July 17, 1970) was a Danish composer.

See also
List of Danish composers

References
This article was initially translated from the Danish Wikipedia.

Male composers
Danish music historians
1897 births
1970 deaths
20th-century Danish composers
20th-century Danish male musicians